Weeting Heath is a  biological Site of Special Scientific Interest west of Thetford in Norfolk, which is managed by the Norfolk Wildlife Trust. It is a Nature Conservation Review site, Grade I, and a National Nature Reserve. It is also part of the Breckland Special Area of Conservation and Special Protection Area.

This grass and lichen heath is grazed by rabbits. It has a high density of breeding birds, including stone-curlews. One arable field is reserved for uncommon Breckland plants.

The site is open at limited times.

References

Norfolk Wildlife Trust
Sites of Special Scientific Interest in Norfolk
National nature reserves in England
Nature Conservation Review sites
Special Protection Areas in England
Special Areas of Conservation in England